Cuahtemoca is a genus of moths of the family Noctuidae. the genus was erected by Robert W. Poole in 1995.

Species
Cuahtemoca unicum (Barnes & Benjamin, 1926) Arizona
Cuahtemoca chalcocraspedon (Dyar, 1913) Mexico

References

Amphipyrinae